The Southeastern Conference Freshman of the Year is a baseball award given to the Southeastern Conference's most outstanding player. The award was first given following the 2000 season, with both pitchers and position players eligible. It is selected by the league's head coaches, who are not allowed to vote for their own players.

Key

Winners

Winners by school

References

2000 establishments in the United States
Awards established in 2000
Southeastern Conference baseball
NCAA Division I baseball conference freshmen of the year